Zhu Yilong (born 16 April 1988) is a Chinese actor. He won Golden Rooster Awards' Best Actor for his performance in "Lighting Up the Stars" in 2022.  Zhu has been the global Ambassador for World Wildlife Fund since 2019.  

He is best known for his roles in the television series Love Three Lives (2014), The Shaw Eleven Lang (2016), Border Town Prodigal (2016), Guardian (2018), The Story of Minglan (2018), Reunion: The Sound of the Providence (2020), The Rebel (2021), Embrace Again (2021), Lighting Up The Stars (2022).

Early life
Zhu Yilong was born in Wuhan, Hubei Province. He graduated from the Beijing Film Academy with a bachelor's degree in performance in 2010.

Career

2009–2016: Beginnings at Oriental Feiyun
In 2008, Zhu debuted in the TV film Zai Sheng Yuan as an assassin. He went on to act in several TV films over the following years; such as The Snatched Bride, Blood-Colored Deep Mansion, Curse of the Blood Jade and Terror Eyes.
One of his most notable roles in his earlier career is Zhu Changxun in the Da Ming Pin Fei film series; as well as General Junshi in Legend of the Daming Palace. He also portrayed a national hero in the war drama Fanjingshan Story, and played the male lead in the wuxia film Ci Fei and romance comedy film Love Retake.

In 2014, Zhu first gained recognition for his performance in the period romance drama Love Three Lives, which won him the "Most Anticipated Actor" award at the Asian Influence Awards Oriental Ceremony. In 2015, he gained increased recognition after starring as Ying Ji in the hit historical drama The Legend of Mi Yue.

In 2016, Zhu starred in wuxia drama The Shaw Eleven Lang, based on the novel of the same name by Gu Long. He played the main antagonist, Lian Chengbi. Zhu's performance earned him the Best Supporting Actor award at TVS Award Ceremony. Zhu starred in another adaptation of Gu Long's novel, playing the protagonist in Border Town Prodigal. He received positive reviews for his performance and his popularity rose significantly afterwards.

2017–2019: Rising popularity
In 2017, Zhu starred alongside Ady An in the romantic comedy drama Royal Sister Returns. The same year, he starred alongside Aaron Kwok and Zhao Liying in the spy thriller film Eternal Wave.

In 2018, Zhu starred in the science fiction mystery web drama Guardian, where he played three roles. The series developed a cult following online, leading to a surge in popularity for Zhu. He won the Popular Actor award at the 2018 Weibo Movie Awards Ceremony. Forbes China listed him under their 30 Under 30 Asia 2018 list which consisted of 30 influential people under 30 years old who have had a substantial effect in their fields. He then starred in the historical drama The Story of Minglan produced by Daylight Entertainment. He received positive reviews for his role as wealthy gentleman who is the female lead's first love, and was nominated for the Best Supporting Actor award at the Magnolia Awards for his performance.

In 2019, Zhu appeared in CCTV New Year's Gala for the first time, performing the song and dance item "Youth Rave It Up". He starred in the workplace romance drama My True Friend as an interior designer, and was nominated for the Best Supporting Actor award at the Asian Television Awards. The same year, he was nominated for the Most Promising Actor award at the China Movie Channel (CCTV-6) M List for his role as a soldier in the film My People, My Country. For his performance in various works, Zhu was awarded the Best Actor in the Emerald Category at the 6th The Actors of China Award Ceremony. That year, Zhu ranked 17th on Forbes China Celebrity 100 list.

2020–present: Breakthrough in Zhu Studio
 
In 2020, Zhu portrayed Wu Xie in the tomb-raiding web series Reunion: The Sound of the Providence, adapted from the Daomu Biji series. Zhu also sung three soundtracks for the drama. The series topped the index charts at iQiyi upon premiere, and received positive reviews. Zhu was praised for his portrayal of Wu Xie. He is set to star in the modern romance drama To Dear Myself opposite Liu Shishi. In April, he began filming the spy drama The Rebel. He ranked 12th on Forbes China Celebrity 100 list.

In 2021, Zhu Yilong starred in the critically acclaimed Republican Drama The Rebel, where he won the Tencent White Paper Award for Best TV drama actor. Also in 2021, Zhu Yilong sign on for a indie film about the Funeral Industry in China, in a Wuhan based production - Lighting Up The Stars. This film tells the story of an ex convict undertaker who encounters an orphan girl who changes his life. Later in 2021, Zhu Yilong starred in the disaster Movie - Cloudy Mountain, and a tribute movie to the epidemic situation in Wuhan, Embrace Again - where both films made a collective total of 7 million RMB at the box office. 

In Spring of 2022, Zhu Yilong sign on for a suspense thriller film Lost in the Stars. In the summer of 2022, Lighting Up The Stars broke 1.7 Billion RMB at the Domestic Box Office, making history in the Chinese Summer Family Film Category. Also in summer 2022 Zhu Yilong was named the ambassador for the Hundred Flower Awards Film Festival in Wuhan where he picked up an award for best actor. He won the best actor at the 2022 Changchun film festival for his performance in Embrace Again, and won Golden Rooster Awards' Best Actor for his performance in Lighting Up the Stars.

Filmography

Film

Television series

Music video

Discography

Bibliography

Other activities
In 2018, Zhu was named the ambassador for the China-Australia Tourism Promotion.

In 2018, Zhu was named the ambassador for the inaugural Hainan Island International Film Festival.

In 2019, it was announced that Zhu will had his wax figure of himself being display in Madame Tussauds Shanghai and Madame Tussauds Hong Kong. His first wax figure was officially displayed at Madame Tussauds Shanghai on 20 Dec 2019. His second wax figure was being officially displayed at Madame Tussauds Hong Kong on 20 Oct 2021.  

In 2019, Zhu was appointed the WWF Ambassador for Global Wildlife Crime Campaign to call on public to reduce the demand for ivory and other endangered species’ products.

In January 2020 he donated $150,000 to fight COVID-19 in his hometown of Wuhan.

Awards and nominations

Listicles

References

External links

1988 births
21st-century Chinese male actors
Living people
Chinese male film actors
Chinese male television actors
Male actors from Wuhan
Beijing Film Academy alumni